Caribbean Chinese cuisine is a style of food resulting from a fusion of Chinese and West Indian cuisines. The Chinese influence is predominantly Cantonese, the main source of Chinese immigrants to the West Indies. West Indian food is itself a mixture of African, British, Indian, Spanish, French, Portuguese, Middle Eastern, Afghan and Indigenous cooking styles.

Although a long-favoured cuisine in West Indian restaurants and Chinese-Caribbean households, it is only recently that an increase in number of Caribbean–Chinese restaurants has occurred in Canada and the United States. These are more often than not “Guyanese restaurants” owing to that country's particular historical connection to Chinese immigration, although signs may also claim “Caribbean Chinese food,” “West Indian and Chinese cuisine”, or variations thereof.

History
In 1834, the black British slaves working in the Caribbean colonies were freed. That eventually created a labour vacuum that was filled by indentured labourers from Madeira, India and China. A sizeable portion of these immigrants were destined for Trinidad and Tobago, Cuba, Jamaica, and Guyana.

The first groups of Chinese immigrants were forcibly kidnapped or deceived into making the journey, although this practice was curbed somewhat by an agreement between British and Chinese authorities to formally supervise recruitment processes. From then on, families were encouraged to emigrate, although often without being completely informed of the working and living conditions or their contractual obligations. Chinese women began arriving in 1860, but in small numbers. The period from 1860 to 1866 saw a relatively large influx of immigrants, bringing the local Chinese population in British Guyana to a peak of 10,022 in 1866. There were only two ships to supplement this population following 1866, and afterwards Chinese immigrants came of their own free will and at their own expense.

Staples
The menus of Caribbean Chinese restaurants are greatly affected by whether or not the restaurant identifies with a specific Caribbean nation or not. Dishes from nation-specific restaurants are often variations on local specialities, in addition to more widely known food items:

 Cha Chee Kai — Crispy Chicken with Skin in sauce.
 Chicken-in-the-Rough — Fried rice with Chinese style fried chicken on the side.
 Jerk Chow Mein — Jerk Pork or Chicken fried with mixed vegetables, soft egg noodles, and sauce.
 Curried Duck Roti — Potatoes and Duck in a curry sauce, rolled in a flakey flatbread.
 Bangamary Ding — Fried bangamary tossed with cashews and mixed vegetables.
 Char Siu Pork Dhalpouri — Chinese pork, peas, onions and geerah (cumin) rolled in a Roti.

Culture
Caribbean Chinese restaurants enjoy considerable popularity in Toronto and New York. Both cities have large Chinese and Caribbean populations.

See also

 Cantonese cuisine
 Caribbean cuisine
 Puerto Rican Chinese cuisine
 Canadian Chinese cuisine
 Chinatown, Toronto
 Chinese Canadian
Chifa

Asian-Caribbean culture
Caribbean cuisine
Chinese Caribbean
Chinese cuisine